Y.1731 is an international standard that defines Operations, Administration and Maintenance (OAM) functions and mechanisms for Ethernet-based networks.

History 
The standard was first developed in 2006 by the Standardization Sector of the International Telecommunication Union (ITU-T) in ITU-T Study Group 13, publishing the original version, as well as a revised version in 2008. From 2010 revisions are done in Study Group 15, beginning with an amendment in 2010. Further major revisions followed in 2011, 2013, and most recently 2015 (as well as a number of amendments).

Definitions 
Y.1731 defines:
 Maintenance domains, their constituent maintenance points, and the managed objects required to create and administer them
 The relationship between maintenance domains and the services offered by VLAN-aware bridges and provider bridges
 The protocols and procedures used by maintenance points to maintain and diagnose connectivity faults within a maintenance domain
 Performance monitoring

References 

ITU-T Y Series Recommendations